The Pinnidae are a taxonomic family of large saltwater clams sometimes known as pen shells. They are marine bivalve molluscs in the order Pteriida.

Shell description

The shells of bivalves in this family are fragile and have a long and triangular shape, and in life the pointed end is anchored in sediment using a byssus. The shells have a thin but highly iridescent inner layer of nacre in the part of the shell near the umbos (the pointed end).

The family Pinnidae includes the fan shell, Atrina fragilis, and Pinna nobilis, the source of sea silk. Some species are also fished for their food value.

Human use
As Rosewater commented in 1961:

"“The Pinnidae have considerable economic importance in many parts of the world. They produce pearls of moderate value. In the Mediterranean area, material made from the holdfast or byssus of Pinna nobilis Linné has been utilized in the manufacture of clothing for many centuries: gloves, shawls, stockings and cloaks. Apparel made from this material has an attractive golden hue and these items were greatly valued by the ancients.

Today, Pinnidae are eaten in Japan, Polynesia, in several other Indo-Pacific island groups, and on the west coast of Mexico. In Polynesia, the valves of Atrina vexillum are carved to form decorative articles, and entire valves of larger specimens are sometimes used as plates.”

Genera
Genera within the family Pinnidae:
 Atrina Gray, 1842
 Pinna Linnaeus, 1758
 Streptopinna von Martens, 1850

References

Further reading
 
 Turner, Ruth D. and Rosewater, Joseph 1958. "The Family Pinnidae in the Western Atlantic" Johnsonia, Vol. 3 No. 38, June 28, 1958, pp. 285–326.
 R. Tucker Abbott & S. Peter Dance, 1982, “Compendium of seashells: a color guide to more than 4,200 of the world’s marine shells”, E.P. Dutton Inc., New York. 

 
Bivalve families